Chris Smith (born June 23, 1987) is an American football defensive back for the Atlanta Havoc of the American Arena League (AAL). He first enrolled Highland Community College before transferring to Northern Illinois University. He attended Palmetto High School in Palmetto, Florida. Smith has been a member of the St. Louis Rams, Omaha Nighthawks, Tampa Bay Storm, Montreal Alouettes, Jacksonville Sharks and Columbus Lions.

College career
Smith recorded 41 tackles, six interceptions, 15 pass break-ups, forced two fumbles and blocked a kick for the Highland Scotties of Highland Community College in 2008. He was a second-team All-Kansas Jayhawk Community College Conference selection.

He enrolled at Northern Illinois University in January 2009. Smith played in 26 games for the Northern Illinois Huskies from 2009 to 2010, starting 25. He earned first-team All Mid-American Conference honors after recording 50 solo tackles, three interceptions and 15 knockdowns his senior season.

Professional career

St. Louis Rams
Smith was signed by the St. Louis Rams of the National Football League (NFL) on July 27, 2011 after going undrafted in the 2011 NFL Draft. He was released by the Rams on August 8, 2011. He was signed by the Rams on November 16, 2011. Smith appeared in three games for the Rams in 2011, recording three tackles. He was released by the Rams on April 30, 2012.

Omaha Nighthawks
Smith was drafted by the Omaha Nighthawks of the United Football League (UFL) with the 17th pick in the 2011 UFL Draft. He spent the 2012 season with the Nighthawks.

Tampa Bay Storm
Smith signed with the Tampa Bay Storm of the Arena Football League (AFL) on November 5, 2012. He was played on Other League Exempt on May 12, 2014.

Montreal Alouettes
Smith was signed by the Montreal Alouettes of the Canadian Football League on May 16, 2014. He was released by the Alouettes on May 31, 2015.

Jacksonville Sharks
On June 9, 2015, Smith was assigned to the Jacksonville Sharks of the AFL. He recorded 26 tackles, two interceptions and six pass breakups in seven games for the Sharks during the 2015 season. On April 9, 2016, Smith was placed on recallable reassignment.

Columbus Lions
Smith spent time with the Columbus Lions of American Indoor Football in 2016. In January 2017, Smith re-signed with the Lions, who had moved to the National Arena League.

Atlanta Havoc
In September 2017, Smith signed with the Atlanta Havoc of the American Arena League for the 2018 season.

References

External links
Just Sports Stats
College stats
Montreal Alouettes bio
NFL Draft Scout

Living people
1987 births
American football defensive backs
Canadian football defensive backs
African-American players of American football
African-American players of Canadian football
Northern Illinois Huskies football players
St. Louis Rams players
Omaha Nighthawks players
Tampa Bay Storm players
Montreal Alouettes players
Jacksonville Sharks players
Columbus Lions players
American Arena League players
Players of American football from Florida
Sportspeople from Bradenton, Florida
21st-century African-American sportspeople
20th-century African-American people